Estill is an unincorporated community in Howard County, in the U.S. state of Missouri.

History
A post office called Estill was established in 1877, and remained in operation until 1944. The community has the name of John R. Estill, the original owner of the town site.

References

Unincorporated communities in Missouri
Unincorporated communities in Howard County, Missouri